Anthony David Holmes AO (b. 1945) is a plastic and reconstructive surgeon who trained in both Australia and the United States, and is qualified in both countries. His primary interest is facial reconstruction and he has developed several new procedures. His most high-profile surgery was in 2009 when he worked with a large team of experts to separate the Bangladeshi conjoined twins Trishna and Krishna. In 1990 he created the Children's Craniofacial Foundation of Australia which has subsequently been renamed The Jigsaw Foundation.

Early years 
In 1969, Holmes graduated from Melbourne University MBBS with honours in Biology, Physiology, Medical Psychology, and Surgery.  He followed this with General Surgery training from 1970 to 1974,  then Plastic Surgery training  from 1975 to 1978 at Royal Melbourne Hospital. He held positions as Plastic Surgery Resident from 1971 and Senior Plastic Surgery Registrar from 1975 at the same hospital. He became a Fellow of the Royal Australasian College of Surgeons in 1978.  Holmes undertook a Plastic Surgery Residency at Harvard Medical School, Boston, USA  from 1976 to 1978. He was certified as a Fellow in Plastic Surgery, Harvard Medical School in 1978 and as a Diplomate of the American Board of Plastic Surgery in 1982.

Craniofacial speciality
Since 1978 Holmes has been Consultant Plastic Surgeon at Royal Children's Hospital, Melbourne where he set up The Melbourne Craniofacial Unit in 1979. He was head of Cleft and Craniofacial Surgery until 2009 and the Director of the Department of  Plastic and Maxillofacial Surgery from 1990 to 2003 when he became Senior Plastic Surgeon. During his career Holmes has been Consultant Plastic Surgeon for a number of hospitals, often concurrently: 1979 to Present Victorian Plastic Surgery Unit, 1979 to 1989  Royal Melbourne Hospital, Melbourne, 1979 to 1980 Peter MacCallum Hospital, Melbourne, 1980 to Present, Epworth Hospital and Consultant Paediatric Plastic Surgeon at Royal Women's Hospital, Melbourne 1993 to Present.

Holmes has trained over thirty Craniofacial Fellows, the majority of whom have become Heads of Departments in Australia and overseas.

He was a young surgeon working in New Guinea when he developed his passion.

Holmes has performed life-changing operations on many children during his career. He has developed and improved new procedures to solve many major and difficult craniofacial reconstructive problems. Holmes and colleagues at The Royal Children's Hospital have developed the "Melbourne Procedure" to normalise the skulls of children with severely deformed heads and has successfully treated more than thirty children. The surgery is not just cosmetic, as restriction on the brain can cause developmental delays. He describes the procedure as “nothing more than advanced carpentry”. This the procedure was used to correct a condition known as scaphocephaly for one-year-old Isaac Jones.

In 2018, at 72, Holmes was still working 60 hours a week; raising funds for the Jigsaw Foundation and operating at the Royal Children's Hospital.

Academic positions 
Since 1981 Holmes has been Associate, Department of Paediatrics at the University of Melbourne. He was awarded the McIndoe Lectureship of the British Association of Plastic, Reconstructive and Aesthetic Surgeons, London in 2010. He was the inaugural Harvard Plastic Surgery Resident's Visiting Professor in 2012. He has 57 articles listed in PubMed.

Professional societies 
Holmes is a member of numerous professional associations and societies:
 1970 Australian Medical Association 
 1982 Australian Society of Plastic Surgeons 
 1984 Australian Association of Surgeons  
 1984 American Society of Plastic Surgeons 
 1990 Australian Cleft Lip & Palate Association 
 1995 Australasian Society of Aesthetic Plastic Surgeons 
 1995 Associate Member, The Neurosurgical Society of Australasia Inc. 
 1998 Asia Pacific Craniofacial Association

Jigsaw Foundation 
Holmes is the  Founder and Board Member of Children's Craniofacial Foundation of Australia which was renamed The Jigsaw Foundation. The foundation, established in 1990,  consists of nine voluntary directors and is a donor funded, not-for-profit organisation which promotes research and education in paediatric craniofacial surgery. While service and community organisations are able to provide travel and accommodation, the foundation supports the Department of Plastic and Maxillofacial Surgery at the Royal Children's Hospital (RCH) in Melbourne by providing advanced equipment. The foundation also supports surgeons from both Australia and overseas while they train in  paediatric craniofacial surgery in the belief that this is the best way to spread knowledge and skills. Additionally the foundation funds the Jigsaw Foundation Chair of Paediatric Plastic and Maxillofacial Surgery at Melbourne University which supports a Professor and several PhD students to carry out further research in paediatric craniofacial surgery.

Significant cases
Holmes was part of a large team involved in the 27 hour surgery to separate the Bangladeshi conjoin twins, Trishna and Krishna who were joined at the skull. Although they were given only a 25 per cent chance of both surviving the separation surgery without brain damage, in 2010 at 7 years old, they were "not only surviving but thriving."

Six year old, Kim Thoa Nguyen was brought from Vietnam by Rotary Overseas Medical Aid for Children (ROMAC). In 2001, Holmes and Andrew Heggie, a maxilo-facial surgeon, a dental surgeon who worked on her upper jawbone, spent 8 months correcting severe cranio-facial deformities.

Eman Tabaza first came to Australia from Gaza in 2004 when she was eight. Holmes led an eight-hour operation at the Royal Children's Hospital which removed the tumour and rebuilt Eman's face. She returned to Melbourne at 16 for further facial surgery and Professor Tony Penington  also performed spinal surgery related to the same birth defect.

ROMAC also brought Asi from Papua New Guinea so that Holmes and Neurosurgeon Mr Patrick Lo were able to correct a rare cranio-facial abnormality called an encephalocele. Operation Rainbow and the Australian Filipino Guidance Association raised funds for eight year old Ronald Aguliar to travel to Australia so that surgeons including Holmes could rebuild his severely deformed face. He was able to return home feeling and acting like a normal child.

Awards
In 2004 Holmes received the Elizabeth Turner Medal which acknowledges “excellence in clinical care provided by a member of the Senior Medical/Dental Staff of the RCH over an extended period of time. This medal is awarded primarily on the basis of the individual’s contribution to the clinical care of their patients."

Holmes was awarded the Royal Children's Hospital Chairman's Medal in 2008 for "a member of staff and recognises exemplary achievement by an individual in her or his chosen field. It commemorates an outstanding contribution to the work and reputation of the RCH, and a significant impact by the individual on the hospital’s vision to be a great children's hospital, leading the way."

In January 2018 Holmes became an Officer of the Order of Australia (AO) for "distinguished service to medicine, particularly to reconstructive and craniofacial surgery, as a leader, clinician and educator, and to professional medical associations".

References

External links 
 The Jigsaw Foundation

Living people
20th-century Australian medical doctors
21st-century Australian medical doctors
Fellows of the Royal Australasian College of Surgeons
Officers of the Order of Australia
University of Melbourne alumni
Harvard University alumni
Year of birth missing (living people)
20th-century surgeons